"Glad All Over" is a 1963 song by The Dave Clark Five.

Glad All Over may also refer to:

 Glad All Over (Dave Clark Five album), 1964
 "Glad All Over" (Carl Perkins song), 1957
 Glad All Over (The Wallflowers album), 2012